Britânia is a municipality in northwestern Goiás state, Brazil.  The population was 5,797 (2020) in a total area of 1461.2 km2.

Municipal boundaries
Municipal boundaries:
North: Aruanã 
South: Jussara 
East: Itapirapuã and Aruanã 
West: the state of Mato Grosso

Highway connections
A paved highway connects Britânia with Santa Fé de Goiás and Jussara. Connections with Goiânia are made by highways GO-060 / Trindade / Claudinápolis / GO-326 / Anicuns / Sanclerlândia / Novo Brasil / GO-324 / Jussara / BR-070 / Nova Trindade / GO-173.

The main rivers are the Vermelho and the Araguaia.  There are also several lakes, like the Tigrinho, Açará and the most important for tourist purposes, the Lago dos Tigres, which is used for fishing, water sports and swimming.

Demographic and political data
Population density in 2003: 3.47 inhabitants/km2 
Population growth rate 2000-2007: -0.57%
Urban population in 2007: 4,085
Rural population in 2007: 988
Eligible voters: 4,278
City government: mayor (Rivadávia Jayme), vice-mayor (Estelila Maria dos Santos Azevedo), and 09 councilpersons

Economic facts
The economy is based on cattle raising, agriculture, commerce (58 units), and some small transformation industries (11 units).
Britânia had a herd of 155,400 in 2006, with 90% being of the Nelore breed.  The land is divided into large properties, which use little labor.  Other important agricultural products are: rice, sesame seeds, manioc, and corn.

Financial institutions in 2004: 01—Bradesco S.A.

Health
Infant mortality rate in 2000: 26.34
Infant mortality rate in 1990: 31.02
Health installations: 05
Hospitals: 02, with 59 beds in 2007

Education
Literacy rate in 2000: 83.2
Literacy rate in 1991: 69.5
Schools in activity: 09 with 1,721 students
Higher education:  none in 2005
MHDI:  0.723
State ranking:  164 (out of 242 municipalities)
National ranking:  2,567 (out of 5,507 municipalities)

History
In 1953 Paulo Carlos Schmidt de Vasconcelos, from São Paulo, bought lands from the government and staked out lots in an endeavour called "Loteamento Lago dos Tigres" next to the lake with the same name.  In 1959 another Paulista, Írio Spinar, bought the land and began to sell lots to farmers, who for the most part came from São Paulo or Paraná.  The settlement grew and in 1958 it became a district of Jussara, later to become a municipality in 1963.

See also
List of municipalities in Goiás

References

Frigoletto

Municipalities in Goiás
1963 establishments in Brazil
Populated places established in 1963